Harrah's New Orleans is a casino in New Orleans, Louisiana, United States, near the foot of Canal Street a block away from the Mississippi River. It is a  casino with approximately 2,100 slot machines, over 90 table games and a poker room. The casino is owned by Vici Properties and operated by Caesars Entertainment.

There are several places to eat ranging from buffet style to fine dining. Since its opening in 1999 Harrah's has been renting nearby hotel rooms to accommodate its guests; currently, the newly renovated 202-room Wyndham Riverfront Hotel is providing such accommodations. In order to avoid leasing rooms, the casino opened its own 27-story hotel tower with 450 rooms across the street from the casino on September 21, 2006, just days ahead of the New Orleans Saints return to the Louisiana Superdome. It is the only land-based private casino with table games in the state by Louisiana law (there are other casinos in the state with their gambling facilities on floating boats and horse racing racinos with slot machines). It is referred to in state statute as "the official gaming establishment".

The casino shut down in the wake of Hurricane Katrina in 2005 but reopened in the midst of Mardi Gras on February 17, 2006.

The location of the casino was most recently previously the site of the Rivergate Convention Center, demolished in 1995. A short tunnel built as part of the canceled Vieux Carré Riverfront Expressway is used for valet parking and for an entrance passing underneath Poydras Street.

History 
The casino is the brainchild of Christopher Hemmeter, a hotel developer in the Hawaiian Islands who returned to the mainland in 1991 when he began to develop casino gaming projects including the nearby River City Casino. His biggest project was a proposed $1 billion casino in New Orleans. Billed at the time as "the world's largest casino". The original design resembled Monte Carlo's 1861 casino, intending to evoke the New Orleans 1885 Cotton Exposition and Chicago's 1893 World Columbia Exposition. The developers estimated the casino would attract one million additional visitors to the city and would generate annual revenues of as much as $780 million, estimates that were based in part on the proven success of dockside gaming in the Mississippi Gulf Coast area.

In 1993 a partnership of Hemmeter and Caesars World obtained the lease on the Rivergate property, which by law was the only place the land-based casino could be built in Louisiana, beating out a rival bid by Harrah's Entertainment. In August 1993, however, the State Casino Board awarded the state's sole casino license to Harrah's and not the Hemmeter-Caesar's partnership. The impasse of one company owning the only license and another owning the only lease was resolved when the two entities formed a joint venture under pressure from then-Governor Edwin Edwards. The new entity, known as "Harrah's Jazz", established a temporary casino in the Municipal Auditorium in order to establish a cash flow while the main facility was under construction at the Rivergate. The temporary facility opened in May 1995 and a week later was closed due to a flood. The poor location of the site resulted in the actual gaming take falling 60% below projections at only $13.1 million per month. Equally concerning was that 60% of gamers at the temporary facility were locals and not out-of-town tourists, undercutting the economic benefit backers hoped gambling would provide to the tourist industry.

Harrah's Jazz halted construction on the permanent facility at 3 AM the day before Thanksgiving, 1995 and laid off 1,600 construction workers and 2,500 casino employees, and filed for bankruptcy. Later, the project was taken over by Harrah's, who completed (albeit scaled-back with only the first floor in use to this day) and opened in late October 1999 Harrah's New Orleans Casino on the site of Hemmeter's project.

In July 2020, Eldorado Resorts acquired Caesars Entertainment (the former Harrah's Entertainment), taking over operations of the property. In connection with that acquisition, Vici Properties bought the real estate of Harrah's New Orleans for $790 million and leased it back to Eldorado (newly renamed as Caesars Entertainment).

In 2020, it was announced that the casino will be renamed Caesars. As of 2022, this change has yet to occur.

See also 
List of casinos in Louisiana

References

External links 

The Rivergate (1968–1995)

Casinos in Louisiana
Hotels in New Orleans
Casinos completed in 1999
Hotel buildings completed in 1999
Caesars Entertainment
Tourist attractions in New Orleans
1999 establishments in Louisiana